Urelytrum is a genus of African plants in the grass family.

 Species

 Formerly included
see Loxodera 
 Urelytrum strigosum - Loxodera strigosa

References

Andropogoneae
Poaceae genera
Grasses of Africa
Taxa named by Eduard Hackel